Richard Barrett may refer to:

People

 Richard Barrett (bishop) (died 1645), Irish bishop
 Richard Barrett (FRS) (fl. 1713), a Fellow of the Royal Society of London
 Riocard Bairéad (Richard Barrett) (1740–1819), poet and schoolmaster from County Mayo, Ireland 
 Richard Barrett (abolitionist) (fl. 1840); see World Anti-Slavery Convention
 Richard Barrett (Irish republican) (1889–1922), executed during Irish Civil War
 Richie Barrett (1933–2006), American musician and record producer
 Richard Barrett (Medal of Honor) (1838–1898), American soldier and Indian Campaigns Medal of Honor recipient
 Richard Barrett (lawyer) (1943–2010), American lawyer and white nationalist
 Richard Barrett (author) (born 1945), British author
 Richard Barrett (counter-terrorism expert) (born 1949), coordinator of the United Nations 1267 Monitoring Team
 Richard Barrett (composer) (born 1959), Welsh composer
 Dicky Barrett (born 1964), American musician known as Dicky Barrett
 Richard Boyd Barrett (born 1967), Irish political activist and chair of the Irish Anti-War Movement
 Richard Barrett (fl. 1987), playwright; see Griffin Theatre Company

Fictional characters
 Richard Barrett, a character in the 1960s British television series The Champions

See also
 Richard Barrett House, on the National Register of Historic Places listings in Summit County, Utah
 Richard Barret (divine) (died 1599), English Catholic divine
 Richard Baret (died 1401), MP for Gloucester
 Richard Barratt (1928–2013), British police officer
 Ricky Barrett (born 1981), baseball player, full name William Domingos Barrett
 Dick Barrett (disambiguation)
 Dicky Barrett (trader) (1807–1847), New Zealand whaler and trader